Nando Zen Pijnaker (born 25 February 1999) is a New Zealand professional footballer who plays as a centre back for League of Ireland Premier Division side Sligo Rovers. Pijnaker also plays for the New Zealand national team.

Early life 
Pijnaker was born in the Netherlands and migrated to New Zealand with his family at the age of three, settling in Rotorua. He attended and played football for Western Heights High School and also began playing for local club Ngongotaha, making his first-team debut at the age of 15.

Club career

Western Suburbs
In 2015 Pijnaker moved to Wellington to join the Olé Football Academy, then run by Declan Edge, and played for affiliated club Western Suburbs in the Central League that features teams from the lower half of the North Island of New Zealand. Pijnaker was part of the team to win the Central League in 2017 and reach the final of the 2018 Chatham Cup.

Eastern Suburbs
Through the Olé Academy partnership, Pijnaker signed for Olé affiliate Eastern Suburbs, winning the ISPS Handa Premiership and qualifying for the OFC Champions League.

Torslanda IK
Following the conclusion of New Zealand's 2019 FIFA U-20 World Cup campaign, Pijnaker joined his former coach Declan Edge at Division 2 Norra Götaland side Torslanda IK, a club run in partnership with the Olé Academy. He made his debut on 15 June 2019, starting in a 3–2 loss to Stenungsunds IF.

Grasshopper
After a 10 day trial, Pijnaker signed in January 2020 with Swiss Challenge League club Grasshopper, joining international teammate Max Mata. He made two appearances for the club.

Rio Ave
After the short stint at Grasshoper, Pijnaker signed a four year deal with Primeira Liga club Rio Ave on the 30 August 2020. On 31 August 2021, Pijnaker was loaned out to Danish 1st Division club FC Helsingør for the rest of 2021.

Sligo Rovers
On 8 February 2022, Pijnaker joined League of Ireland Premier Division side Sligo Rovers on a season-long loan deal. On 21 December 2022, his transfer was made permanent.

International career

U-20
Pijnaker was named in the New Zealand U-20 side for the 2019 FIFA U-20 World Cup. Pijnaker played in all four games, playing full 90 minutes in all but one of them.

National team
Pijnaker made his senior debut for New Zealand on 18 November 2019, coming on as a substitute in their 0–1 loss to Lithuania.

Honours
Western Suburbs
Central League winners: 2017, 2019
2018 Chatham Cup runner-up: 2018

Eastern Suburbs
New Zealand Football Championship champions: 2018–19

References

External links

1999 births
Living people
New Zealand association footballers
New Zealand expatriate association footballers
New Zealand youth international footballers
New Zealand international footballers
Dutch footballers
Dutch emigrants to New Zealand
Footballers at the 2020 Summer Olympics
Olympic association footballers of New Zealand
People from Brummen
Association football defenders
Western Suburbs FC (New Zealand) players
Eastern Suburbs AFC players
Grasshopper Club Zürich players
Torslanda IK players
Rio Ave F.C. players
FC Helsingør players
Sligo Rovers F.C. players
New Zealand Football Championship players
Swiss Challenge League players
League of Ireland players
New Zealand expatriate sportspeople in Sweden
New Zealand expatriate sportspeople in Switzerland
New Zealand expatriate sportspeople in Denmark
New Zealand expatriate sportspeople in Portugal
New Zealand expatriate sportspeople in Ireland
Expatriate footballers in Sweden
Expatriate footballers in Switzerland
Expatriate footballers in Portugal
Expatriate men's footballers in Denmark
Expatriate association footballers in the Republic of Ireland
New Zealand under-20 international footballers
Footballers from Gelderland
Sportspeople from Rotorua
People educated at Western Heights High School